Mikveh Israel ( "Hope of Israel") is an agricultural school and village in Israel.

Mikveh Israel may also refer to:

Synagogues

Netherlands Antilles
 Mikvé Israel-Emanuel, synagogue in Curaçao, Netherlands Antilles

United States
 Congregation Mickve Israel, Savannah, Georgia, United States
 Congregation Mikveh Israel, Philadelphia, United States
 Mikveh Israel Cemetery, Philadelphia, United States